The  is the prefectural parliament of Chiba Prefecture.

Current composition 
As of 2021, the assembly was composed as follows:

Organisation

President and Vice-President

President: Mitsuyasu Shida (LDP), elected from Chōshi and Tōnoshō
Vice-president: Yoshikatsu Enosawa (LDP), elected from Sodegaura

Electoral districts

References

Prefectural assemblies of Japan
Politics of Chiba Prefecture